Abdoul Kairou Amoustapha (born 1 January 2001) is a Nigerien footballer who currently plays for Cancún in the Liga de Expansión MX.

Career
Amoustapha moved from ASN Nigelec to USL Championship side Loudoun United on 20 February 2020. He made his debut on 2 August 2020, starting against Hartford Athletic in a 1–4 loss.

In October 2020, Amoustapha began training with Loudoun's parent club D.C. United after the conclusion of Loudoun's season. In October 2021, Amoustapha was recalled to his parent club, MFK Vyskov. He was subsequently dispatched to Cancún F.C. immediately following his return from Loudoun.

International
Amoustapha has made three appearances each on the Niger U-17 and U-20 national football teams. He scored his first international goal with the U-20 side during the 2019 Africa U-20 Cup of Nations, on 9 February 2019, against Burundi's own U-20 side, in a match that ended in a 3–3 draw.

On 31 October 2020, Amoustapha was called up by the senior Niger national football team as part of the preliminary squad for the 2021 Africa Cup of Nations qualification round. He later made his first appearance with the national team on 13 November, coming in as a substitute in Niger's 1–0 victory over Ethiopia.

References

External links
 

2001 births
Living people
Nigerien footballers
Association football forwards
ASN Nigelec players
Loudoun United FC players
Cancún F.C. footballers
USL Championship players
Liga de Expansión MX players
Nigerien expatriate footballers
Nigerien expatriate sportspeople in the United States
Nigerien expatriate sportspeople in Mexico
Expatriate soccer players in the United States
Expatriate footballers in Mexico
Niger youth international footballers
Niger under-20 international footballers
Niger international footballers